Licking Township, Ohio, may refer to:

Licking Township, Licking County, Ohio
Licking Township, Muskingum County, Ohio

Ohio township disambiguation pages